The Minister of Supply was a member of the government of Sweden. The minister of supply was the head of the Ministry of Supply from 1939 to 1950 which handled matters relating to the national economy.

History
The minister of supply headed the Ministry of Supply which was established on 15 October 1939 to deal with administrative matters concerning general guidelines for the government's activities to ensure the supply within Sweden of necessities that were important for the population or production.  was entrusted with the task of organizing the new ministry, for matters relating to the national economy, of which Eriksson became the first head. This was perhaps Eriksson's greatest and for Sweden's most significant contribution at this time. As his successor in the position of minister of supply expressed himself about its organization, "it was so expedient and well adapted to the demands of the crisis situation that the whole thing could later be seen as self-evident". Eriksson was succeeded by Axel Gjöres in 1941, who held the position for 6 years. Gjöres in turn was replaced by Gunnar Sträng in 1947. Gjöres had made very important contributions as minister both during the war and in the years immediately after. He did not want to leave the post in 1947, because the Swedish economy was in a very precarious situation.

Gunnar Sträng had been persuaded to become minister of supply. He was then given responsibility for the regulatory policy that was maintained for several years after the Second World War, when it was feared that the depression would strike like after the First World War. That was not the case. Unemployment on a national basis was low, and prices were reasonably kept in order. Gunnar Sträng was succeeded by Karin Kock who became Sweden's first female cabinet minister. In December 1949, Prime Minister Tage Erlander forced Kock to leave her ministerial post to become director general of Statistics Sweden. She was not happy about the change and would have liked to stay, something Erlander had a hard time understanding, considering that her influence had been reduced to insignificance. Erlander had instead wanted Axel Strand, the head of the Swedish Trade Union Confederation, as minister of supply. He declined, however and  took over the post for six months before the ministry and thus the post ceased on 30 June 1950.

List of officeholders

References

Notes

Print

Lists of political office-holders in Sweden
1939 establishments in Sweden
1950 disestablishments in Sweden